The pygmy smelt (Osmerus spectrum) is a North-American freshwater fish in the family Osmeridae. It is found in a number of deep, thermally stratified lakes in eastern Canada and New England (United States).

The pygmy smelt coexists with the rainbow smelt Osmerus mordax, and is distinguished from it by slower growth, earlier maturation, shorter life span, later spawning time, and use of smaller food items.

Genetic data suggest that the pygmy smelt occurrences in each lake have evolved independently from the rainbow smelt lineage, which calls the identity of the pygmy smelt as a species into question.  Another, intermediate form of smelt has been identified in Lake Utopia, New Brunswick, which is genetically distinct from local rainbow smelt but is able to hybridize with it.

Sources

Osmerus
Fish described in 1870
Taxonomy articles created by Polbot
Freshwater fish of North America
Taxa named by Edward Drinker Cope
Taxobox binomials not recognized by IUCN